The world records in chess listed here are achieved in organized tournament, match, or simultaneous exhibition play.

Game length records

Longest game
The longest tournament chess game (in terms of moves) ever to be played was Nikolić–Arsović, Belgrade 1989, which lasted for 269 moves and took 20 hours and 15 minutes to complete a drawn game. At the time this game was played, FIDE had modified the fifty-move rule to allow 100 moves to be played without a piece being captured in a rook and bishop versus rook endgame, the situation in Nikolić versus Arsović. FIDE has since rescinded that modification to the rule.

The longest decisive tournament game is Danin–Azarov, Turnov 2016, which Danin won in 239 moves. In the 9th round of THT Extraliga (highest Czech team league), Danin needed to win his game to make the match end in a 4:4 draw. Although he managed to do so, his team (TŽ Třinec) was relegated from the highest league in the end.

The second-longest decisive tournament game is Fressinet–Kosteniuk, Villandry 2007, which Kosteniuk won in 237 moves. The last 116 moves were a rook and bishop versus rook ending, as in Nikolić – Arsović. Fressinet could have claimed a draw under the fifty-move rule, but did not do so since neither player was keeping count, it being a rapid chess game. Earlier in the tournament, Korchnoi had successfully invoked the rule to claim a draw against Fressinet; the arbiters overruled Fressinet's argument that Korchnoi could not do so without keeping score. Fressinet, apparently wanting to be consistent, did not try to claim a draw against Kosteniuk in the same situation.

The longest game played in a world championship is the 6th game of the 2021 World Chess Championship between Magnus Carlsen and Ian Nepomniachtchi, which Carlsen won in 136 moves by resignation. The game lasted for 8 hours, 15 minutes and 40 seconds.

Shortest game

Shortest decisive game
The fewest moves required to deliver checkmate in chess is two, in what is known as Fool's mate (1.g4 e5 2.f3 Qh4 and variants thereof). This has been known to occur in amateur play. Chessgames.com gives a game L. Darling–R. Wood, 1983, that was published on April Fool's Day in Northwest Chess magazine (1.g4 e6 2.f4?? Qh4#). Bill Wall lists, in addition to Darling–Wood, three other games that ended with Black checkmating on the second move. Another example is I. Skrypin-A. Glebov, Ukrainian under-8 championship, Yevpatoria 2007 (1.f4 e6 2.g4?? Qh4#).

The same game had previously been played in Leeky–Mason, Dublin 1867.

If one counts forfeited games as a loss in zero moves, then there have been many such forfeits, the most notable examples being Game 2 of the 1972 world championship match between Boris Spassky and Bobby Fischer, which Fischer defaulted, and Game 5 of the 2006 world championship match between Vladimir Kramnik and Veselin Topalov, which Kramnik defaulted.

Under FIDE rules instituted around 2008, a player who is late for the beginning of a round loses the game,  as does a player who has a forbidden electronic device (by default any device). The former rule was used at the 2009 Chinese Championship to forfeit Hou Yifan for arriving five seconds late for the beginning of a round. The latter rule was used to forfeit Aleksander Delchev against Stuart Conquest after the move 1.d4 in the 2009 European Team Championship.

The German grandmaster Robert Hübner also lost a game without playing any moves. In a World Student Team Championship game played in Graz in 1972, Hübner played one move and offered a draw to Kenneth Rogoff, who accepted. However, the arbiters insisted that some moves be played, so the players played the following ridiculous game: 1.c4 Nf6 2.Nf3 g6 3.Ng1 Bg7 4.Qa4 0-0 5.Qxd7 Qxd7 6.g4 Qxd2+ 7.Kxd2 Nxg4 8.b4 a5 9.a4 Bxa1 10.Bb2 Nc6 11.Bh8 Bg7 12.h4 axb4 (draw agreed). The arbiters ruled that both players must apologize and play an actual game at 7 p.m. Rogoff appeared and apologized; Hübner did neither. Hübner's clock was started, and after an hour Rogoff was declared the winner. Wang Chen and Lu Shanglei both lost a game in which they had played no moves. They agreed to a draw without play at the 2009 Zhejiang Lishui Xingqiu Cup International Open Chess Tournament held in Lishui, Zhejiang Province, China. The chief arbiter declared both players to have lost the game.

More rarely, a player might decide to protest by resigning a game rather than forfeiting. A game between Fischer and Oscar Panno, played at the Palma de Mallorca Interzonal 1970, went: 1.c4 Black resigns. Panno refused to play to protest the organizers' rescheduling of the game to accommodate Fischer's desire not to play on his religion's Sabbath. Panno was not present when the game was to begin. Fischer waited ten minutes before making his move and went to get Panno to convince him to play. Fifty-two minutes had elapsed on Panno's clock before he came to the board and resigned. (At the time, an absence of sixty minutes resulted in a forfeit.)

The shortest decisive tournament game between masters that was decided because of the position on the board (i.e. not because of a forfeit or protest) is Z. Đorđević–M. Kovačević, Bela Crkva 1984. It lasted only three moves (1.d4 Nf6 2.Bg5 c6 3.e3 Qa5+ winning the bishop), and White resigned. This was repeated in Vassallo–Gamundi, Salamanca 1998. (In a number of other games, White has played on after 3...Qa5+, occasionally drawing or even winning in this line.)

The shortest game ever lost by a grandmaster because of the position on the board was by future world champion Viswanathan Anand, who resigned on move 6 against Alonso Zapata in 1988 (1.e4 e5 2.Nf3 Nf6 3.Nxe5 d6 4.Nf3 Nxe4 5.Nc3 Bf5?? 6.Qe2 winning a piece, since 6...Qe7 is answered by 7.Nd5 Qe6 8.Nxc7+). Semyon Alapin, a very strong player who was not technically a grandmaster because the formal title did not exist during his lifetime, lost a game of the same length to Siegbert Tarrasch in 1889 (1.e4 e5 2.Nf3 Nf6 3.Nxe5 d6 4.Nf3 Nxe4 5.d3 Be7?? 6.dxe4).

Shortest draw
A game may be drawn by mutual agreement in any number of moves. Traditionally, it has been common for players to agree to a "grandmaster draw" after playing about 10–15 moves of known opening theory and making no serious effort to win. This is usually done to preserve energy in a tournament, after a devastating loss in the previous round of the tournament, or in the final round when no prize money is at stake. There has been some debate over the ethics of the practice, and recently there has been a trend away from such games, with many tournaments adopting measures to discourage short draws. If the tournament officials (unlike those at Graz and Lishui) do not object, a game may even be agreed drawn without a single move being played. According to ChessGames.com, in the 1968 Skopje–Ohrid tournament Dragoljub Janosevic and Efim Geller agreed to a draw without playing any moves. Tony Miles and Stewart Reuben did the same thing in the last round of the Luton 1975 tournament, "with the blessing of the controller", in order to assure themselves of first and second places respectively.

Shortest World Championship game
As mentioned above, Fischer (in 1972) and Kramnik (in 2006) each forfeited a world championship game without playing any moves. Other than those unplayed games, the shortest game in a world championship was the 21st match game in the World Chess Championship 1963 between Mikhail Botvinnik and Tigran Petrosian. The players agreed to a draw after the 10th move by White (Petrosian). The shortest decisive, non-forfeited world championship game occurred between Viswanathan Anand and Boris Gelfand in game 8 of the World Chess Championship 2012. Gelfand resigned after Anand's 17th move, 17.Qf2.

Shortest stalemate

The shortest known stalemate, composed by Sam Loyd, involves the sequence 1.e3 a5 2.Qh5 Ra6 3.Qxa5 h5 4.Qxc7 Rah6 5.h4 f6 6.Qxd7+ Kf7 7.Qxb7 Qd3 8.Qxb8 Qh7 9.Qxc8 Kg6 10.Qe6 (diagram). The shortest stalemate with all of the pieces on the board, composed by Charles H Wheeler, occurs after 1.d4 d6 2.Qd2 e5 3.a4 e4 4.Qf4 f5 5.h3 Be7 6.Qh2 Be6 7.Ra3 c5 8.Rg3 Qa5+ 9.Nd2 Bh4 10.f3 Bb3 11.d5 e3 12.c4 f4 (minor variations are possible). These games are nonsensical from the point of view of chess strategy, but both have occasionally been played in tournaments as a joke, as part of a prearranged draw. The shortest known route to a position where both players are stalemated, discovered by Enzo Minerva and published in the Italian newspaper l'Unità on August 14, 2007, is 1.c4 d5 2.Qb3 Bh3 3.gxh3 f5 4.Qxb7 Kf7 5.Qxa7 Kg6 6.f3 c5 7.Qxe7 Rxa2 8.Kf2 Rxb2 9.Qxg7+ Kh5 10.Qxg8 Rxb1 11.Rxb1 Kh4 12.Qxh8 h5 13.Qh6 Bxh6 14.Rxb8 Be3+ 15.dxe3 Qxb8 16.Kg2 Qf4 17.exf4 d4 18.Be3 dxe3.

The shortest genuine stalemate in a serious game was played in Ravenna 1982, when the Italian master Mario Sibilio forced a stalemate on move 27 against grandmaster Sergio Mariotti.

Fewest moves played in a tournament
In the Premier I group at the 2003 Capablanca Memorial tournament, Péter Székely took just 130 moves (an average of 10 moves per game) to draw all 13 of his games.

Game play records

Latest first capture
In Rogoff–Williams, World Junior Chess Championship, Stockholm 1969, the first capture (94.bxc5) occurred on White's 94th move. Filipowicz–Smederevac, Polanica Zdroj 1966, was drawn in 70 moves under the fifty-move rule, without any piece or pawn having been captured.

Latest first capture in a decisive game

Nuber–Keckeisen, Mengen 1994 lasted 31 moves without a single capture. In the end Keckeisen, facing imminent checkmate, resigned.

 
In the decisive game Yates–Znosko-Borovsky, Tunbridge Wells 1927, the first capture occurred on Black's 40th move.

1.e4 e5 2.Nf3 Nc6 3.Bb5 a6 4.Ba4 Nf6 5.0-0 Be7 6.Re1 b5 7.Bb3 d6 8.c3 Na5 9.Bc2 c5 10.d4 Qc7 11.h3 0-0 12.Nbd2 Bd7 13.Nf1 Nc6 14.d5 Nd8 15.g4 Ne8 16.Ng3 g6 17.Kh2 Ng7 18.Rg1 f6 19.Be3 Nf7 20.Rg2 Kh8 21.Qd2 Qc8 22.Rh1 Rg8 23.Rhg1 a5 24.Kh1 b4 25.c4 a4 26.Bd3 Qa6 27.Qe2 Raf8 28.Nd2 Qc8 29.f3 Ne8 30.Ndf1 Kg7 31.Bc1 h6 32.Ne3 Kh7 33.Rh2 Nh8 34.h4 Rf7 35.Nd1 Bf8 36.Nf2 Bg7 37.f4 Bf8 38.Qf3 Qd8 39.Nh3 Qe7 40.g5 (diagram) Bxh3 41.f5 hxg5 42.hxg5 Rgg7 43.Rxh3+ Kg8 44.fxg6 Rxg6 45.Nf5 Qd7 46.Rg2 fxg5 47.Rgh2 Bg7 48.Rxh8+ Bxh8 49.Qh5 Rff6 50.Qxh8+ Kf7 51.Rh7+ Ng7 52.Rxg7+ Rxg7 53.Qxg7+

Latest castling

The latest castling occurred on Black's 48th move in Neshewat-Garrison, Michigan 1994 and Somogyi-Black, New York 2002.

Theoretical novelties

The book 1000 TN!! The Best Theoretical Novelties contains the games with the ten highest-ranked  (TNs) that appeared in each of Volumes 11 through 110 of Chess Informant. The earliest such novelty occurred on White's fourth move in Karpov–Miles, Bugojno 1978, namely 1.c4 b6 2.d4 e6 3.d5 Qh4 4.Nc3 The latest occurred on Black's 34th move (34...Kd5!) in Shulman–Marin, Reykjavík Open 2009. The only game to receive a perfect rating from Chess Informant'''s panel of judges was Miles–Belyavsky, Tilburg 1986, which featured the novelty 18.f4 It received 90 points, 10 out of a possible 10 from each of the 9 judges.

National records

Most grandmasters
Following the breakup of the Soviet Union, Russia has continued to hold the record for greatest number of grandmasters. In the November 2018 rating list, 229 of the 1645 grandmasters were from Russia.

Greatest concentration of resident grandmasters
In 2005, Reykjavík, Iceland, with eight grandmasters (Jón L. Árnason, Jóhann Hjartarson, Margeir Pétursson, Friðrik Ólafsson, Thröstur Thórhallsson, Helgi Grétarsson, Hannes Stefánsson, and Bobby Fischer) had a higher percentage of resident grandmasters per capita than any other city worldwide; the city of 114,000 had, therefore, one grandmaster per 14,000 residents.

Most rated players
As of November 2018, Germany has the highest number of active FIDE-rated players with 11,813. Russia, by comparison, has 11,313.

Strongest team
The USSR team that participated in the 13th Olympiad (Munich 1958) had been claimed as the strongest team ever. It was composed of four world champions (Mikhail Botvinnik, Vasily Smyslov, Mikhail Tal and Tigran Petrosian), one world championship challenger (David Bronstein) and Paul Keres, four times runner-up in the Candidates Tournament.

Tournament records
Perfect tournament scores
In top-class chess it is rare for a player to complete a tournament or match with a 100 percent score. Some notable examples are:
Gustav Neumann at Berlin in 1865 (34/34)
William Pollock at Belfast 1886 (8/8)
Emanuel Lasker at New York in 1893 (13/13)
Henry Atkins at Amsterdam 1899 (15/15)
José Raúl Capablanca at New York in 1913 (13/13, including one default)
Dawid Janowski at Paris in 1914 (9/9)
Alexander Alekhine at Moscow in 1919–20 (11/11)
Boris Kostić at Hastings 1921–22 (7/7)
Bobby Fischer at the US Championship of 1963/64 (11/11)
Alexander Beliavsky at Alicante in 1978 (13/13)Sunnucks also lists Alekhine's 10/10 score at Caracas 1939, but Soltis writes that it, and Buenos Aires 1926, which Alekhine won with the same score, were "weak events". .
Sandro Mareco at Montevideo in 2017 (9/9)

William Lombardy is the only player ever to achieve a perfect score in the World Junior Chess Championship, open to players under the age of 20 as of January 1 in the year of competition. He scored 11–0 at Toronto 1957.

Vera Menchik won four consecutive Women's World Chess Championship tournaments with perfect scores, a total of 45 games (8–0 at Prague 1931, 14–0 at Folkestone 1933, 9–0 at Warsaw 1935, and 14–0 at Stockholm 1937). She only played 43 of the 45 games, since Harum, the Austrian contestant, was unable to reach Folkestone and thus forfeited all of her games in that double round robin event.

Robert Gwaze scored 9–0 on first board for Zimbabwe at the 35th Olympiad (Bled, 2002).

Valentina Gunina won the Women's section of the 2010 Moscow Blitz tournament with a 17/17 score.

Wesley So scored 9/9 in the 2011 Inter-Provincial Chess Team Championship, with a performance rating of 3037, won the gold medal in men's blitz at the SEA Games 2011 at Indonesia with a score of 9/9 and a rating performance of 3183, and won the 2013 Calgary International Blitz Championship with a score of 9/9.

Consecutive tournament victories
The record for consecutive professional tournament victories is 15; Garry Kasparov placed first or equal first in 15 consecutive tournaments from 1981 to 1990. The same page credits Kasparov with "a record for the most consecutive victories in super tournaments" at 10, without defining what a super tournament is.

Most tournament victories
As of December 2011, John Curdo had won 865 tournaments.  When he died in 2022, he was credited with winning 1,009 tournaments. 

Most wins in a national championship
As of 2017, Carlos Juárez has won the Guatemalan Chess Championship 27 times.

Most decisive Interzonal victory
The highest percentage score at an Interzonal was 82.5% (16½ points out of 20 games), scored by Alexander Kotov at the 1952 Stockholm Interzonal. The largest margin of victory was achieved by Bobby Fischer, who won the Palma de Mallorca Interzonal in 1970 with 18½ points out of 23 games, 3½ points ahead of second-place finishers Bent Larsen, Efim Geller and Robert Hübner.

Most games won
Gustav Neumann won all 34 of his games at the aforementioned Berlin 1865 tournament.

Most games lost
Nicholas MacLeod holds the record for the most games lost in a single tournament: he lost 31 games at the Sixth American Chess Congress at New York 1889, while winning six and drawing one. MacLeod was only 19, and the tournament, a 20-player double-round robin, was one of the longest tournaments in chess history. The most games lost by a player who lost all of his games in a tournament was by Colonel Moreau. At Monte Carlo 1903, Moreau lost all 26 of his games.

Lost all games on time
At the Büsum 1969 tournament, Friedrich Sämisch lost all 15 games by exceeding the time control."Saemisch . . . was brought in as a last minute substitute. He made chess history by losing every game on time." The Chess Player, Modern Opening Chess Theory as Surveyed in Busum 1969 Complete with All the Games (1969), p. 1. He lost all 13 of his games at the Linköping 1969 tournament the same way.

Most world champions in a tournament
Nottingham 1936 included five past, current, and future world champions: reigning champion Max Euwe; Alexander Alekhine, who had lost the title to Euwe the prior year, and would regain it the following year; former champions Emanuel Lasker and José Raúl Capablanca; and Mikhail Botvinnik, who would win the championship in 1948. This record was equaled by Moscow 1971 and the 1973 Soviet Chess Championship, each of which included former champions Vasily Smyslov, Mikhail Tal, and Tigran Petrosian; Boris Spassky, who was champion from 1969 to 1972; and future champion Anatoly Karpov.B. Cafferty and M. Taimanov, The Soviet Championships, Cadogan Books, 1998, p. 160. .

Largest tie for first
Thirteen players tied for first with 5–1 scores at the National Open held on March 17–19, 2000 in Las Vegas: grandmasters Jaan Ehlvest, Alexander Goldin, Alexander Baburin, Pavel Blatny, Eduard Gufeld, Yuri Shulman, Alex Yermolinsky, Gregory Kaidanov, Dmitry Gurevich, Alexander Stripunsky, and Gregory Serper, and International Masters Rade Milovanovic and Levon Altounian.

Highest percentage of players below 50% in a tournament
At the Linares 2001 tournament, five of the six players (83.3%) finished with a minus score. Garry Kasparov won with 7½/10, while Judit Polgár, Alexander Grischuk, Peter Leko, Alexei Shirov, and Anatoly Karpov tied for second to sixth places, each with 4½/10.

Highest percentage of draws in a tournament
98.8% of all games at the Iranian Chess Tournament in 2023, played in a round robin format, were drawn, eventual winner Mehdi Latifi being the only one who won games.

Highest performance rating in a tournament

The highest known tournament performance rating is 3103, achieved by Karen H. Grigoryan, when he scored a perfect 9/9 at the 2019 Cidade de Famalicão tournament.VII Torneio Internacional Cidade de Famalicão, chess-results.com

The highest known performance rating at the top level is 3098 by Fabiano Caruana at the 2014 Sinquefield Cup.

Longest consideration for a move

Before the introduction of chess clocks, it was common for players to take more than an hour to decide on a move. Among the players who had a reputation for playing particularly slowly (taking over 2 hours for a move) are Alexander McDonnell and Elijah Williams, however, it was not normal practice to time a player's moves so claims about the slowness of a player in an untimed game must be considered unverified.

In Vigo, Spain in 1980, the Brazilian International Master Francisco Trois spent 2 hours and 20 minutes over his 7th move, deciding which of two viable moves to make. After blitzing out another 21 moves in serious time trouble, he resigned. His opponent, Luis Santos asked him after the game, "How can you think for over two hours when there are only two possible moves? I don't understand." Trois replied, "Neither do I."

Match records
Perfect scores
Perfect scores were achieved in matches by:
Howard Staunton over Daniel Harrwitz in 1846 (7/7)
Wilhelm Steinitz over Joseph Henry Blackburne in 1876 (7/7)
Capablanca over Kostić in 1919 (5/5)
Fischer over Mark Taimanov in 1971 (6/6) (quarter-final Candidates Match)
Fischer over Bent Larsen in 1971 (6/6) (semi-final Candidates Match)

Highest percentage of draws in matches
At the World Chess Championship 2018, all 12 classical games ended in draws (100%). Only in the tiebreaks, there were three decisive rapid games.

Playing records

Consecutive wins against masters
Bobby Fischer won 20 consecutive games, all in competitions at late stages of the world championship cycle. (Some commentators give this as 19, not counting Fischer's game against Oscar Panno, who resigned after Fischer's first move as a protest.) Fischer won his last seven games at the 1970 Palma de Mallorca Interzonal (including the one-move game against Panno), then swept Mark Taimanov 6–0 in the quarterfinals followed by Bent Larsen by the same score in the semifinals. In the Candidates Match final, Fischer beat former World Champion Tigran Petrosian in the first game before Petrosian snapped the streak by winning the second match game.

Wilhelm Steinitz won his last 16 games at Vienna 1873, including a two-game playoff against Joseph Henry Blackburne at the end. He played no serious chess until an 1876 match against Blackburne that Steinitz swept 7–0. After a long period of inactivity, Steinitz played at Vienna 1882, where he won his first two games before finally ending his winning streak with a draw. Steinitz's 25-game winning streak over nine years has never been equaled.

Longest unbeaten streak
The longest confirmed unbeaten streak at an elite level belongs to Magnus Carlsen, who achieved an unbeaten streak of 125 games in the classical time format. His streak started after a loss on July 31, 2018, in the Biel tournament against Shakhriyar Mamedyarov, and ended on October 10, 2020, when he lost to Jan-Krzysztof Duda in a game at the Altibox Norway Chess Tournament. The streak consists of 42 wins and 83 draws. It includes three wins in the Norwegian Chess League against opponents rated more than 500 Elo points lower, which Carlsen prefers not to count. Carlsen's streak broke the previous record of 100 games by Ding Liren, who went unbeaten from August 2017 to November 2018. Ding in turn had taken the record from Mikhail Tal, who managed 95 games unbeaten in 1973–74.

Bogdan Lalić's unbeaten streak of 155 games (against less elite players than those Carlsen faced) is confirmed to have taken place between 2010 and 2011, according to the FIDE ratings website.

In correspondence chess, Denny Marbourg achieved an unbeaten streak of 169 games, according to the ICCF U.S.A. website.

Most world champions defeated
This includes games against players who were not yet or were no longer world champion at the time of the game.

Paul Keres, Viktor Korchnoi, and Alexander Beliavsky are the only chess players to have defeated 9 undisputed world champions in classical games. 
 Keres defeated every world champion from Capablanca (3rd) to Fischer (11th): José Raúl Capablanca, Alexander Alekhine, Max Euwe, Mikhail Botvinnik, Vasily Smyslov, Mikhail Tal, Tigran Petrosian, Boris Spassky, Bobby Fischer.
 Korchnoi defeated every world champion from Botvinnik (6th) to Kasparov (13th), and also Carlsen (16th): Botvinnik, Smyslov, Tal, Petrosian, Spassky, Fischer, Anatoly Karpov, Garry Kasparov, Magnus Carlsen. 
 Beliavsky has defeated every world champion from Smyslov (7th) to Carlsen (16th), except for Fischer: Smyslov, Tal, Petrosian, Spassky, Karpov, Kasparov, Vladimir Kramnik, Viswanathan Anand, Carlsen.

If disputed world champions are included, then Garry Kasparov, Korchnoi, and Beliavsky share the record at 11. Kasparov has defeated 7 undisputed world champions (Smyslov, Tal, Petrosian, Spassky, Karpov, Kramnik, Anand) as well as 4 FIDE world champions (Alexander Khalifman, Ruslan Ponomariov, Rustam Kasimdzhanov and Veselin Topalov). Korchnoi defeated the 9 mentioned above, plus FIDE champions Ponomariov and Topalov. Beliavsky defeated the 9 mentioned above, plus FIDE champions Khalifman and Topalov. 

If draws are included, Korchnoi beat or drew with 11 undisputed world chess champions in a row in classical games (he had draws against Anand and Kramnik) and all 4 disputed world champions (draws against Khalifman and Kasimdzhanov) – that is, every one since Alekhine's death in 1946.

Rating records

FIDE (chess's international governing body) adopted Elo ratings in 1970. Players who peaked before this year therefore do not feature in rating records.

Highest rating
The highest rating ever achieved is 2882, by Magnus Carlsen on the May 2014 list and once again on the August 2019 list.

{| class="wikitable sortable" style="font-size:100%;"
|+Progression of highest rating record
!Player
!Rating
!Year-month first achieved
|-
| Bobby Fischer
| align=center | 2760
| 1971–01
|-
| Bobby Fischer
| align=center | 2785
| 1972–01
|-
| Garry Kasparov
| align=center | 2800
| 1990–01
|-
| Garry Kasparov
| align=center | 2805
| 1993–01
|-
| Garry Kasparov
| align=center | 2815
| 1993–07
|-
| Garry Kasparov
| align=center | 2820
| 1997–07
|-
| Garry Kasparov
| align=center | 2825
| 1998–01
|-
| Garry Kasparov
| align=center | 2851
| 1999–07
|-
| Magnus Carlsen
| align=center | 2861
| 2013–01
|-
| Magnus Carlsen
| align=center | 2872
| 2013–02
|-
| Magnus Carlsen
| align=center | 2881
| 2014–03
|-
| Magnus Carlsen
| align=center | 2882
| 2014–05
|}

Carlsen also holds the highest unofficial "live rating" of 2889.2, achieved on April 21, 2014.

Largest rating lead
On the July 1972 FIDE rating list, Bobby Fischer's rating of 2785 was 125 points ahead of the second-highest rated player, then-reigning World Champion Boris Spassky (2660). Kasparov's biggest lead at his peak was 82 points in January 2000. In both the January and July 1990 rating lists, Kasparov was rated 2800 while Karpov was the only player rated 2700+, with third place being at 2680 although the identity of the third-place player changed. Magnus Carlsen's biggest lead was 74 points in October 2013.

Jeff Sonas of Chessmetrics calculates that in April 1876 Wilhelm Steinitz was the top-ranked player in the world, with a rating a record 199 points above that of Henry Bird, the second-ranked player.

Longest duration as number one
Garry Kasparov was the world's highest-rated player on FIDE's rating list for a record 255 months, a number that is well ahead of all other world number ones since the inception of the list. Before the list, Emanuel Lasker was the world's highest-rated player for 292 months between June 1890 and December 1926 according to Chessmetrics.

Age-related records
Youngest world champion 
 Youngest undisputed world champion: Garry Kasparov; 22 years, 6 month and 27 days, title won 1985
 Youngest disputed FIDE world champion: Ruslan Ponomariov; 18 years, 3 month and 13 days
 Youngest Women's World Chess Champion: Hou Yifan; 16 years, 9 month and 27 days, title won 2010

Youngest grandmaster
The youngest player to be awarded the grandmaster title by FIDE is Abhimanyu Mishra. In 2021, he qualified for the title at the age of 12 years, 4 months, and 25 days. See List of youngest grandmasters for the history of this record.

Oldest grandmaster

Several players have been awarded honorary or retrospective grandmaster titles based on their past achievements. The oldest of these was Enrico Paoli, who was awarded the title in 1996 at the age of 88.

Apart from retrospective awards, a number of players have achieved the title by winning the World Senior Championship. The oldest player to gain the title in this way was Yuri Shabanov, who won the 2003 event and was awarded the title at the age of 66.

Oldest combined age of players in a match
In 2014, GM Viktor Korchnoi (b. 1931) played a two-game match against GM Wolfgang Uhlmann (b.1935). Korchnoi won both games. The combined age of the two players was 162 years, which is almost certainly a record for a standard time control match between Grandmasters. In rapid time control, GM Viktor Korchnoi played a four-game rapid match against GM Mark Taimanov (b.1926) in November 2015. Korchnoi won the match 2–1 with one draw. The combined ages of the players was 174. This was the first time since 1980 that Korchnoi had played in an official or friendly match with an opponent older than himself. Retrieved October 16, 2010.

Youngest player to defeat a grandmaster

On July 28, 2012, Awonder Liang, aged 9 years, 3 months, and 20 days, beat Grandmaster Larry Kaufman in the Washington International tournament.

Oldest player to defeat a grandmaster

In the aforementioned rapid match in November 2015 between Mark Taimanov and Viktor Korchnoi, Taimanov was approximately 89 years and 9 months old when he won one of the match games against Korchnoi. The oldest known player to beat a grandmaster in a tournament game at standard time controls is Anthony Saidy. In Round 3 of the National Open Chess Championship in Las Vegas, played sometime between June 17 and 19, 2019, Saidy, aged 82 years and 1 month, beat grandmaster Vladimir Belous (age 25).

Simultaneous and blindfold records

Best and worst results in simultaneous exhibitions

In 1922, José Raúl Capablanca, the recently crowned World Champion, played 103 opponents simultaneously in Cleveland. He completed the exhibition in seven hours, scoring 102 wins and one draw (99.5%), the best result ever in a simultaneous exhibition on over 75 boards.

The best result in a simultaneous exhibition solely against grandmasters is former World Champion Garry Kasparov's performance against an Israeli team consisting of Boris Alterman, Alexander Huzman, Ilya Smirin, and Emil Sutovsky at Tel Aviv in 1998. Adding to the difficulty Kasparov played Black in half the games; usually in exhibitions the exhibitor plays White on all boards. A second round was played 2 days later with colors reversed. Kasparov scored 7–1 against an all 2600+ rated team and considers it one of the peak performances of his career.

Paul Morphy also gave an impressive exhibition. On April 26, 1859, at London's St. James Chess Club, Morphy played "five games simultaneously against a group of masters who could be described as among the top ten players of the day", scoring 3–2. He defeated Jules Arnous de Rivière and Henry Bird, drew with Samuel Boden and Johann Löwenthal, and lost only to Thomas Wilson Barnes.

The worst result in a simultaneous exhibition given by a master occurred in 1951, when International Master Robert Wade gave a simultaneous exhibition against 30 Russian schoolboys, aged 14 and under. After 7 hours of play, Wade had lost 20 games and drawn the remaining 10.GM Alexander Kotov wrote that former World Champion Max Euwe warned new arrivals in Moscow, "Just don't give exhibitions against Pioneers" (i.e. students at the Palaces of the Pioneers) .

Most games in blindfold exhibitions
The record for the most games played in a blindfold simultaneous exhibition is 48, set by Timur Gareyev in December 2016, when he played 48 opponents over 20 hours, scoring 35 wins, 7 draws and 6 losses.

Most players taking part in a multi-simul
20,500 players played simultaneously on December 24, 2010, in Ahmadabad, India. Then-World Champion Viswanathan Anand was a guest of honor for this event and participated in the simul.

Most simultaneous games
On February 8–9, 2011, Iranian grandmaster Ehsan Ghaem-Maghami played for 25 hours against 604 players, winning 580 (97.35%) of the games, drawing 16, and losing 8.

Writing-related records

Longest-running chess column
Leonard Barden's daily chess column for the London Evening Standard'' began in June 1956, and was published daily in the printed newspaper until July 30, 2010, a total run of 54 years and 1 month. It then continued online until January 31, 2020, for a total of 63 years, 7 months and 27 days without missing a day.

Notes

References

Bibliography

 Concentrates on maximum tasks and records.

External links
 Tim Krabbé's chess records page
 Edward Winter, "Chess Records"

History of chess
Chess